In topology, a branch of mathematics, the Knaster–Kuratowski fan (named after Polish mathematicians Bronisław Knaster and Kazimierz Kuratowski) is a specific connected topological space with the property that the removal of a single point makes it totally disconnected. It is also known as Cantor's leaky tent or Cantor's teepee (after Georg Cantor), depending on the presence or absence of the apex.

See also
Antoine's necklace

References

Topological spaces